Lavaka, the Malagasy word for "hole", usually found on the side of a hill, is a type of erosional feature common in Madagascar. However, Lavaka have also been found in South Africa, the Democratic Republic of the Congo, and South Carolina, and similar landforms have been found in Brazil, the Great Plains of the U.S., and Eswatini. They are most common in tropical regions between the Cancer and Capricorn latitudes, especially the Central Highlands of Madagascar, where approximately one metre thick laterites develop on steep terrains in a monsoonal climate.  Lavaka form where these hard laterites overlie thick (tens of metres) saprolite, on steep (35 to 55 degree) slopes, in areas that have a hot dry season and a warm wet season.

Lavaka are not landslides.  They are a type of gully, formed via groundwater sapping. They are usually shaped like a tear-drop with a steep, round headwall that narrows downhill into a shallow outlet channel.  

Although human activities—such as deforestation, overgrazing, road creation, and grassland burning—can contribute to lavaka formation, lavakas can also develop by purely natural processes.  Work by Neil Wells and colleagues showed that air photos reveal remnants of ancient lavakas in recently deforested areas, showing that those areas were eroded by lavakas before the rain forests grew; and radiocarbon dating indicates that some lavakas are up to 20,000 years old, meaning they were present in the Malagasy landscape before the arrival of humans (human arrival in Madagascar is less than 2000 years before present).

Among the natural controls on Lavaka formation are the amount of seismic activity in the region, the topographic relief (or slope), and hydraulic conductivity of materials in the saprolite. For instance, earthquakes in the region can cause cracks in the hard, upper layer of laterite, which allows water to seep into the more porous layer of saprolite underneath. This causes chemical reactions within the saprolite to leach certain minerals from the rock and if the hydraulic conductivity of that rock is high enough, the water can carry those minerals away, which can cause the infrastructure of that rock to collapse and erode.

Lavaka can often cause a lot of damage to nearby communities. During the monsoon season, heavy rains carry away all the eroded material from the lavaka, which can destroy surrounding crops and infrastructure. This is the basis for much of the recent research that has been conducted on the variables involved in lavaka formation (especially in Madagascar, where Lavaka pepper the Central Highland landscape).

The term "Lavaka" entered the international geography/geology vocabulary following the work of Riquier (1954). To differenciate it from the generic hole vocabulary (aka, trou, in French, and lavaka in Malagasy), this new vocabulary should be capitalized in scientific usage. More importantly, since the word has been taken directly from the vernacular name, it should be considered as an irregular word. Thus, Lavaka can be singular or plural when used.

References
Cox, R., Bierman, P., Jungers, M.C. and Rakotondrazafy, A.F.M., 2009, Erosion rates and sediment sources in Madagascar inferred from 10Be analysis of lavaka, slope, and river sediment. Journal of Geology, v. 117, p. 363-376. 
Cox, R., Zentner, D.B., Rakotondrazafy, A.F.M., and Rasoazanamparany, C.F., 2010, Shakedown in Madagascar: Occurrence of lavakas (erosional gullies) associated with seismic activity. Geology, v. 38, p. 179-182.
Raveloson, A., Visnovitz, F., Székely, B., Molnár, G., Udvardi, B., 2012, A multidisciplinary study on lavaka (gully erosion) formation in Central Highlands, Madagascar.  European Geoscience Union General Assembly April 22-27, Geophysical Research Abstracts, v. 14, EGU2012-12483-1
Riquier, Jean, Etude sur les « lavaka », Mémoires de l'Institut Scientifique de Madagascar, Tananarive, Série D : Sciences de la Terre, 1954, p. 169-189.
Udvardi, B., Raveloson, A., Visnovitz, F., Szabó, Cs., Kovács, I., Székely, B., 2012, Sedimentological features of lateritic and saprolitic horizons in a mid-slope lavaka, Central Highlands, Madagascar. European Geoscience Union General Assembly April 22-27, Geophysical Research Abstracts, v. 14, EGU2012-4365
Voarintsoa, N. R. G.; Cox, R.; Razanatseheno, M. O. M.; Rakotondrazafy, A. F. M. Relation between Bedrock Geology, Topography and Lavaka Distribution in Madagascar. South African Journal of Geology 2012, 115 (2), 225–250. https://doi.org/10.2113/gssajg.115.225.
Wells, N.A., Andriamihaja, B., Rakotovololona, H.F.S., 1991, Patterns of development of lavaka, Madagascar's unusual gullies: Earth Surface Processes and Landforms, v. 16, p. 189-206.
Wells, N.A., Andriamihaja, B., 1993, The initiation and growth of gullies in Madagascar: are humans to blame?: Geomorphology, v. 8, p. 1-46.

External links
More about lavakas
Lavaka image database by Rónadh Cox at Williams College Digital Collections: Team Lavaka image collection

Landforms of Madagascar
Erosion landforms
Geology of Madagascar